Desmiphoropsis mannerheimi is a species of beetle in the family Cerambycidae. It was described by Thomson in 1865. It is known from French Guiana.

References

Compsosomatini
Beetles described in 1865